"Jaded" is a song by Canadian rapper Drake from his album, Scorpion (2018). It was released along with the album on June 29, 2018. The song was co-written by Drake, singer Ty Dolla Sign, and Noel Cadastre, and was produced by the latter. It features additional background vocals by Ty Dolla Sign. R&B singer Jacquees remixed the song. Drake fans have speculated about the identity of the woman described in the lyrics.

Critical reception
While comparing "Jaded' to the Aerosmith's song of the same name, Winston Cook-Wilson writing for Spin called Drake's hit a "slithering, soporific trap ballad" and The Independent, in its review of the album, wrote that the "track falls flat". Nevertheless, the song did well on various charts around the world, reaching the Top 40 in the United States and Canada.

Charts

References

2018 songs
Drake (musician) songs
Songs written by Drake (musician)
Songs written by Ty Dolla Sign